Walter E. Terry was a Wisconsin Politician (1909 – 1977) who served as a member of the Wisconsin State Assembly from 1959 to 1965 and later Wisconsin Senate, serving the 27th district of Wisconsin from 1967 to 1969. Terry was a graduate of Baraboo High School and the University of Notre Dame. A member of the Republican Party, he was succeeded in the Wisconsin Senate by Everett Bidwell. As a Wisconsin state senator, Terry served as the chairman of the Committee on Agriculture and the Public Welfare during the 1960s.

Notes

People from Sauk County, Wisconsin
University of Notre Dame alumni
Republican Party members of the Wisconsin State Assembly
Republican Party Wisconsin state senators
1909 births
1977 deaths
20th-century American politicians